The term township, in Canada, is generally the district or area associated with a town. The specific use of the term to describe political subdivisions has varied by country, usually to describe a local rural or semirural government within the country itself.

In Eastern Canada, a township is one form of the subdivision of a county. In Quebec, the term is canton in French.

Maritimes

The historic colony of Nova Scotia (present-day Nova Scotia, New Brunswick, and Prince Edward Island) used the term township as a subdivision of counties and as a means of attracting settlers to the colony. In Prince Edward Island, the colonial survey of 1764 established 67 townships, known as lots, and 3 royalties, which were grouped into parishes and hence into counties; the townships were geographically and politically the same. In New Brunswick, parishes have taken over as the present-day subdivision of counties, and present-day Nova Scotia uses districts as appropriate.

Ontario
In Ontario, there are both geographic townships and township municipalities. Geographic townships are the original historical administrative subdivisions surveyed and established primarily in the 1800s. They are used primarily for geographic purposes, such as land surveying, natural resource exploration and tracking of phenomena such as forest fires or tornados, but are not political entities. Township municipalities, also called "political townships", are areas that have been incorporated with municipal governments, and are a lower-tier municipality (if located in a county or regional municipality, i.e. in Southern Ontario) or single-tier municipality (if located in a district, i.e. in Northern Ontario).

A township municipality may consist of a portion of one or more geographic townships united as a single entity with a single municipal administration. Often rural counties are subdivided into townships. In some places, usually if the township is in a county rather than in a regional municipality, the head of a political township may be called a "reeve", not a mayor. However, the distinction is changing as many rural townships are replacing the title with "mayor" to reduce confusion. A few townships keep both titles and designate "mayor" as the head of the municipal council and use "reeve" to denote the representative to the upper tier (usually county) council.

The term "geographic township" is also used in reference to former political townships that were abolished or superseded as part of municipal government restructuring.

Quebec

In Quebec, townships are called cantons in French and can also be political and geographic, similar to Ontario although the geographic use is not used much or at all. They were introduced after the British Conquest, primarily as a surveying unit. They were designated and cover most of the unattributed territory in Eastern Quebec and what is now known as the Eastern Townships and later used in surveying the Outaouais and Saguenay-Lac-Saint-Jean regions.

Townships often served as the territorial basis for new municipalities, but township municipalities are no different from other types such as parish or village municipalities.

Prairies and BC
In the Prairie Provinces and parts of British Columbia, a township is a division of the Dominion Land Survey. The townships are not political units (although political boundaries often follow township boundaries) but exist only to define parcels of land relatively simply. Townships are divided into 36 equal  square parcels, known as "sections."

Three municipalities in British Columbia, Langley, Esquimalt and Spallumcheen, have "township" in their official names but legally hold the status of district municipalities.

See also
List of townships in Ontario
List of townships in Prince Edward Island
List of townships in Quebec
List of township municipalities in Quebec

References

 
Subdivisions of Canada
Statistics Canada
Canada 3
Townships, Canada